One third of West Oxfordshire District Council in Oxfordshire, England is elected each year, followed by one year without election. Since the last boundary changes in 2002, there are a total 49 councillors elected from 27 wards, each councillor serving a four-year term.

Political control
Since the first election to the council in 1973 political control of the council has been held by the following parties:

Leadership
The leaders of the council since 2001 have been:

Council elections
Summary of the council composition after recent council elections, click on the year for full details of each election. Boundary changes took place for the 2002 election leading to the whole council bring elected in that year.

1973 West Oxfordshire District Council election
1976 West Oxfordshire District Council election
1979 West Oxfordshire District Council election (New ward boundaries)
1980 West Oxfordshire District Council election
1982 West Oxfordshire District Council election
1983 West Oxfordshire District Council election
1984 West Oxfordshire District Council election
1986 West Oxfordshire District Council election (District boundary changes took place but the number of seats remained the same)
1987 West Oxfordshire District Council election

District result maps

By-election results
By-elections occur when seats become vacant between council elections. Below is a summary of recent by-elections; full by-election results can be found by clicking on the by-election name.

References

External links
West Oxfordshire District Council

 
West Oxfordshire District
Council elections in Oxfordshire
District council elections in England